Snickers is a brand of peanut, caramel and chocolate-based confectionery bar. 

Snickers may also refer to:
 Snickers, a daily light verse feature created by Charles Ghigna and syndicated by Tribune Media Services
 Petrus Matthias Snickers, Dutch clergyman
 Snickers, nickname for the Anticenter shell galaxy

See also
 Snicker, a form of laughter